José Bernabé Gutiérrez Parra (born December 21, 1952) is a Venezuelan politician who served as Governor of Amazonas from 1996 to 2001, and Senator representing Amazonas from 1994 and 1996. He was a notable leader of Democratic Action (AD) in the last years of Venezuela's bipartisan democracy. In 2020 he was appointed by the Supreme Tribunal of Justice (TSJ) as chair of AD and currently leads the pro-government version of the party.

Career 
In 1994 he was elected Senator of the extinct Congress of Venezuela representing Amazonas. He left his seat in the Senate when became governor of Amazonas in the 1995 election. He was re-elected in 1998. He was declared winner of the 2000 elections against leftist Liborio Guarulla by a small margin, but later the Supreme Tribunal of Justice (TSJ) ordered to repeat the election in polling places where some irregularities were found. Gutiérrez lost to Guarrulla and left the governorship.

On June 15, 2020, the Supreme Tribunal of Justice illegally suspended the party's national committee to appoint an ad hoc board of directors chaired by Gutiérrez, days after his brother José Luis Gutiérrez was appointed by the TSJ as rector of the National Electoral Council. Bernabé was expelled from AD the next day. Gutiérrez-led AD controls the presence of the party in the ballot, a pro-government party to gain voters from other opposition parties.

References 

Venezuelan politicians
Members of the Senate of Venezuela
Governors of Amazonas (Venezuelan state)
Democratic Action (Venezuela) politicians
1952 births
Living people